Padmabhushan Dr. Moturi Satyanarayan Award (Devnagari: पद्मभूषण डॉ. मोटूरि सत्यानारायण पुरस्कार) is a literary honor in India which Kendriya Hindi Sansthan, (Central Hindi Organization), Ministry of Human Resource Development, annually confers on writers of outstanding works in Hindi Literature. It is also a Hindi Sevi Samman and is given to number of Hindi experts for playing their important role in promoting the Hindi language.

History
The award was established by Kendriya Hindi Sansthan in 1989 on the name of the Great Hindi Activist Moturi Satyanarayana. It was first awarded in the year 2002 to Shri. Harishankar 'Aadesh'''.

Honour
Padmabhushan Dr. Moturi Satyanarayan Award is awarded for Promotion of Hindi language in abroad every year by the President Of India.

 Recipients

References

External links
 पद्मभूषण डॉ. मोटूरि सत्यानारायण पुरस्कार''

Indian literary awards
Awards established in 2002
2002 establishments in India
Hindi